Bijni is a town in Chirang district under the jurisdiction of Bodoland Territorial Council which controls the districts of the Bodoland Territorial Region in the state of Assam.

Geography
It has an average elevation of 53 metres (173 feet). The main river in Bijni is Dolani, which currently has three bridges over it. The  longest of them is the bridge between Bijni and Kawatika. The city is flanked by two bigger tributaries of the Manas river. The city also has a flyover, which cuts the road between the northern region and southern region.

Demographics
 Indian census, Bijni had a population of 13257. Males constitute 50.4% of the population and females 49.6%.

Politics

Bijni is part of Kokrajhar (Lok Sabha constituency).

See also 
 Bijni Vidhan Sabha

References

Cities and towns in Chirang district
Bongaigaon